is a 2013 otome game for PlayStation Portable. It was developed by Otomate and published by Idea Factory. A PlayStation Vita port, entitled Norn9: Var Commons, was released on December 11, 2014. A fandisk titled Norn9: Last Era has been announced and was released on April 2, 2015. On March 2, 2014, it was announced that an anime adaptation was in the works. The anime ran from January 7 to March 31, 2016.

Plot
Guided by a strange, haunting song, elementary-schooler Sorata Suzuhara from the Heisei Era is warped back in time to 1919, in a high-tech ship called Norn9. This ship, flying above towns resembling that of the Meiji or Taishō period, harbours The Gifted, a group of three girls and eight boys with special abilities. As he tries to find a way to return to his time, he discovers incredible secrets about the world and spacetime itself.

Anime
On March 2, 2014, Idea Factory announced that Norn9: Norn + Nonette has an anime in the works during the "Norn9 with Ark & for Spica" event at Tokyo's Nakano Sun Plaza. The anime aired from January 7 to March 31, 2016. The opening theme is "Kazakiri" by Nagi Yanagi and the ending theme is "Zero Tokei" by Kaori Oda. On December 29, 2015, the anime was licensed by Sentai Filmworks in North America.

The series was streamed on Hulu and Anime Network.

Episode list

Note

Music
The game's background music was written by Australian composer Kevin Penkin. Famed Final Fantasy series composer Nobuo Uematsu wrote the game's main theme, which was arranged by Penkin. Three pieces of theme music are used throughout the game. All three songs are performed by Nagi Yanagi. For Norn9: Last Era, the opening theme is foe while the ending theme is skyscape. Both songs are also performed by Yanagi.

References

External links

 

2013 video games
2016 anime television series debuts
Idea Factory franchises
NBCUniversal Entertainment Japan
Orange (animation studio)
Otome games
PlayStation Portable games
PlayStation Vita games
Sentai Filmworks
Video games developed in Japan
Video games scored by Kevin Penkin